Eden Isle is a census-designated place (CDP) in St. Tammany Parish, Louisiana, United States, on the northeast shore of Lake Pontchartrain. The population was 7,041 at the 2010 census. It is part of the New Orleans–Metairie–Kenner Metropolitan Statistical Area. The area is a residential community with homes built on a system of canals connecting to eastern Lake Pontchartrain, which also includes businesses along the Interstate-10 corridor as well as restaurants and marina services within the residential section.

Geography
Eden Isle is located at  (30.224116, -89.800390).

The area was devastated by Hurricane Katrina in August 2005.

Originally, the land was a marsh with a canal and levee bordering a pine forest behind Salmen High School and Our Lady of Lourdes Catholic Church and School. The marsh was drained and filled over a period of several years prior to the development of the community.

Demographics

2020 census

As of the 2020 United States census, there were 7,782 people, 3,225 households, and 2,105 families residing in the CDP.

2000 census
As of the census of 2000, there were 6,261 people, 2,761 households, and 1,860 families residing in the CDP. The population density was 1,838.9 people per square mile (711.0/km). The racial makeup of the CDP was 93.15% White, 2.64% African American, 0.53% Native American, 2.19% Asian, 0.03% Pacific Islander, 0.32% from other races, and 1.15% from two or more races. Hispanic or Latino of any race were 2.44% of the population.

There were 2,761 households, out of which 22.4% had children under the age of 18 living with them, 58.6% were married couples living together, 5.2% had a female householder with no husband present, and 32.6% were non-families. 25.7% of all households were made up of individuals, and 6.1% had someone living alone who was 65 years of age or older. The average household size was 2.27 and the average family size was 2.72.

In the CDP, the population was spread out, with 17.8% under the age of 18, 6.7% from 18 to 24, 27.4% from 25 to 44, 36.2% from 45 to 64, and 11.9% who were 65 years of age or older. The median age was 44 years. For every 100 females, there were 104.6 males. For every 100 females age 18 and over, there were 104.7 males.

The median income for a household in the CDP was $53,811, and the median income for a family was $71,083. Males had a median income of $50,417 versus $34,712 for females. The per capita income for the CDP was $31,798. About 6.9% of families and 9.8% of the population were below the poverty line, including 18.4% of those under age 18 and 7.8% of those age 65 or over.

References

External links
 Eden Isles Homeowners Association

Census-designated places in Louisiana
Census-designated places in St. Tammany Parish, Louisiana
Census-designated places in New Orleans metropolitan area